Jalan Paloh (Johor state route 16) is a major road in Johor, Malaysia. It connects Yong Peng until Kluang

List of interchanges

Roads in Johor